Ljosland is a village in Åseral municipality in Agder county, Norway. The lake Ljoslandsvatnet lies just south of the village.
 
Ljosland has a ski resort that is popular in the winter time, with ski lifts and many ski slopes. There are many holiday cottages located in the village. The Ljosland Fjellstove hotel was built here in 1937 and has served tourists since then.  Ljosland Chapel was built in the village in 1959 to serve the residents of northwestern Åseral.

References 

Villages in Agder
Åseral